Jakob Guttmann may refer to:

 Jakob Guttmann (rabbi) (1845–1919), German rabbi
 Jakob Guttmann (sculptor) (1811–1860), Hungarian Jewish sculptor